Hardomil (d. before 1327) was a Serbian nobleman that served king Stefan Milutin (r. 1282–1321), with the title of tepčija. He was mentioned as deceased in 1327, in a litigation between his sons' estates and Hilandar. His sons inherited notable land property, which evidents his social status and property state, but not his jurisdiction. The judgement established that his sons, Dmitar and Borislav (called the Hardomilić brothers in historiography), had unlawfully used Hilandar's property, and thus the property was returned to Hilandar. Hardomil was succeeded by Vladoje ( 1326), who served king Stefan Dečanski (r. 1321–31) as tepčija. The Serbian court hierarchy at that time was as follows: stavilac, čelnik, kaznac, tepčija and vojvoda, the supreme title.

References

Sources

14th-century Serbian nobility
People of the Kingdom of Serbia (medieval)
1320s deaths
13th-century births
Tepčija